"I Luv Your Girl" is the third and final single from The-Dream's debut studio album, Love/Hate. The track is produced by The-Dream's production partner, Christopher "Tricky" Stewart.

Music video
The two music videos were directed by Fat Cats and premiered April 28, 2008 on BET's 106 & Park. It features Young Jeezy rapping the first verse and has cameos from Chingy, Ne-Yo, Jazze Pha and Jermaine Dupri. The video also features New York Giants defensive end Osi Umenyiora. There are two versions of the music video. The first was an edited version, the directors cut, while the second, more explicit version featured The-Dream mouthing the explicit chorus and back-up dancers making explicit hand gestures toward the camera.

Remixes
The official remix features Young Jeezy and was used for the video. An additional unofficial remix titled "I Fucked Your Girl" was released by G-Unit and featured former member Young Buck. The remix was made to diss Fat Joe. In this version, everyone except Lloyd Banks and Young Buck use the auto-tune effect. Other unofficial remixes followed from Fabolous and Jagged Edge. T-Pain sings an interpolation of the song on Jamie Foxx's hit "Blame It" on Foxx's Intuition (2008).

Chart position

Weekly charts

Year-end charts

References

2008 singles
The-Dream songs
Songs written by The-Dream
Song recordings produced by Tricky Stewart
2007 songs
Def Jam Recordings singles